6 Athiyayam is a 2018 Tamil-language horror anthology film directed by Cable Sankar, Shankar Thiyagarajan, Ajayan Bala, E. A. V. Suresh, Lokesh Rajendran, and Sridhar Venkatesan. It includes six separate stories, each part being directed by a different director. The film features an ensemble cast including   Thaman Kumar, S. S. Stanley, Pop Suresh, Baby Sathanya, Pasanga Kishore, Madhu Sri, Sanjeev, Gayathri, Cable Sankar, Vishnu, Francis, Vinoth Kishan, Aravind Rajagopal, and Charulatha Rangarajan.

The film was produced by Shankar Thiyagarajan with a promotional song composed by Sam C. S., and lyrics by Karki Bava. The film was released on 23 February 2018.

Cast and crew

For each chapter

Common credits 
 Producer: Shankar Thiyagarajan
 Executive producer: Cable Sankar
 Music director: Taj Noor, Joshua, Sathish Kumar, Jose Franklin, Sam C. S.
 Choreography: Nanda
 Visual effects: V Focus Digital Media
 Director of Photography (Song): C. J. Rajkumar

Production 
The film was produced by Shankar Thiyagarajan of Ascii Media Hut, for whom it is their debut production. Shankar stated he had the urge to do something experimental and pitched the idea of a horror anthology to various film-makers, eventually getting thirty young story writers who were interested. They then shortlisted five, and with Shankar's own film, it became six short films. In addition, for most of the directors, it is their debut film, with the exception of Cable Sankar who had previously directed the film, Thottal Thodarum (2015). Ajayan Bala also has experience in the industry, having written the screenplay for films such as Chennaiyil Oru Naal (2013) and Manithan (2016). Shankar Thiyagaran initially titled the film Hexa, with the tagline of 6 Athiyayam, but later made the tagline the title.

Soundtrack

The film's audio track was released on 30 October 2017 in a function attended by leading Tamil directors Cheran, Parthiban, Vetrimaran, A. Venkatesh, Arivazhagan and producer G. Dhananjayan. Composer Sam C. S. worked on a promotional song for the film and selected Kavitha Thomas to sing the track.

References

External links
 

2018 films
2018 horror films
Indian horror anthology films
Films scored by Sam C. S.
Indian nonlinear narrative films
2010s Tamil-language films
Indian anthology films